Alex Ben Lindsay (born July 10, 1970) is an American computer graphics and video production specialist.  He is also the founder of the Pixel Corps and dvGarage which were both companies involved with computer graphics, computer animation and video production.

Background 
Lindsay spent three years working at Lucasfilm and Industrial Light and Magic on Star Wars: Episode I – The Phantom Menace (1999) and Titan A.E. (2000). 

He also played Rum Sleg in The Phantom Menace, for which action figures are available.

He has taught at the Academy of Art and at the San Francisco State Multimedia Studies Programs. He has written for 3D Magazine, 3D World and Post. He was a regular guest on the US cable channel TechTV, and has appeared as a guest on G4techTV Canada's television show The Lab with Leo Laporte.

Currently, he is Head of Operations at 090 Media.

Podcasting 
Lindsay produced the internet show MacBreak, which in 2006 made episodes available online in 1080p, a notably high resolution at the time. He also regularly participates in MacBreak Weekly, a weekly talk show/netcast on the TWiT network, and hosts the Virtual Final Cut Pro X Users Group dedicated to working with Apple Inc.'s non-linear editing system software.

Currently, he produces the daily Zoom webinar Office Hours which is a panel discussion about media production technology.

References

External links 
 
 090 Media
 Office Hours Website A global conversation where no one’s left out
 The home of the TWiT network

Living people
American bloggers
American podcasters
1971 births
TWiT.tv people